Tapio Antero Saramäki (12 June 1953) is a Finnish engineer and professor emeritus. He is a pioneer in Finnish digital signal processing (DSP) since 1981. His diploma engineer thesis (1978) and doctor of technology thesis (1981) was the first digital signal processing theses in Tampere University of Technology.

Awards and honors 
 Circuits and Systems Society's Guillemin-Cauer Award (1988) 
 IEEE Fellow (2002) for contributions to the design and implementation of digital filters and filter banks 
 The Journal of Circuits, Systems, and Computers Best Paper Award (2003) 
 Circuits and Systems Society's Guillemin-Cauer Award (2006)

References 

1953 births
People from Orivesi
Fellow Members of the IEEE
Academic staff of the University of Tampere
Living people